The CSI Tiruchirappalli Thanjavur Diocese is a diocese of Church of South India in Tamil Nadu state of India. The diocese is one among the 24 dioceses of Church of South India and was one of the first 14 dioceses to be formed at the inaugural of the Church of South India in 1947.

About the diocese
The diocese spreads over the Mayiladuthurai district, Nagapattinam District, Tiruvarur District, Thanjavur District, Tiruchirappalli District, a part of Perambalur District, Karur District, a part of Tirupur district, a part of Coimbatore District, a part of Cuddalore District, a part of Pudukottai District, a part of Ariyalur District and part of the Union Territory of Puducherry & Karaikal. For administration purposes the diocese is subdivided into eight District Church Councils(DCC) - Thanjavur DCC, Tiruchirappalli DCC, Perambalur-Collidam DCC, Karur DCC, Dharapuram DCC, Udumalaipettai DCC, Tharangambadi-Nagapattinam DCC and the Anaimalai Hills DCC. The diocese had a membership of 88,831 in 2000 and the mission in the diocese is carried through 100+ ordained pastors along with a bishop. The diocese has a partnership with Leicester in The United Kingdom. Empowerment of women and Dalits is the main thrust of the diocese.

Ministry 
The diocese does Education Ministry, Hospital Ministry, Tribal Welfare Ministry, Mission and Evangelisation Ministry and Ministry among women.
Education Ministry: The diocese has 52 primary schools, 2 high schools, 17 higher secondary schools (including St.Peter's Higher Secondary School, Thanjavur, which taught English to Indians for the first time in India since 1784, St.John's Vestry Higher Secondary School and Bishop Heber Higher Secondary School, Teppakulam, Tiruchirappalli in education service since 1763 and 1762 respectively), 2 nursing schools, 1 industrial training centre and 5 colleges specialised in Arts & Science, Management, Nursing & Community Welfare (including Bishop Thorp College, Dharapuram, the first self-financing college in Tamil Nadu State). All institutions of this diocese are religious minority educational institutions. These institutions are some of the earliest institutions of the Tamil Nadu state started by the then missionaries with a highly dedicated sacrifice and a vision of super quality education in the area wherever they are located. Most of these institutions are residential.
Hospital Ministry: The diocese has 2 general hospitals; The CSI Mission General Hospital is located in Uraiyur, Tiruchirappalli and the CSI Dr.Anne Booth Mission Hospital in CSI Mission Compound, Dharapuram. These hospitals are multi-speciality hospitals on service committed and dedicated to the glory of God through the ministry of healing with modern facilities, infrastructure, dedicated management and staff.
Tribal Welfare Ministry: The diocese operates Tribal Welfare programmes in the tribal area whichever is located in the jurisdiction of the diocese.
Mission and Evangelisation Ministry: The diocese does a Mission and Evangelisation programme within the limit of the diocese's territories.
Ministry among women: Having the motto of empowering women in the diocese, the diocese operates various programmes and welfare measures for the development of the lifestyle and social status of the women.
Diocesan Press and Book: The diocese has its own printing press at Uraiyur, Tiruchirappalli; where they print all their reading materials. They also publish a book called "Thiruchabai Malar" on every month which is circulated internally.

Officers of the Council
The diocese is headed by a bishop, who is an elected presbyter through the Diocesan Council. He is considered the head of the diocese and all the institutions belonging to the diocese. Other than the Bishop as the head of all, the Clerical Secretary position takes care of the Pastoral & Evangelical workers in the diocese, the Lay Secretary position takes care of all the Lay Workers in the diocese, the Educational Secretary position takes care of all Educational Institutions and the workers of those institutions and as usual of all the organisations, this diocese also has a position for the Diocesan Treasurer to manage all the incomes and expenditures of the diocese.

Bishops of the diocese and their tenure
Following is the list of bishops who served in the Diocese.

† The Right Rev. Dr. Edgar Bentley Thorp (1947-1962)

Wesleyan Methodist missionary Rt. Rev. Dr. Edgar Bentley Thorp, who was born in Bengaluru was the first Bishop of the diocese. He was consecrated as a bishop in St. George's Cathedral, Chennai on 27 September 1947 when he was aged 42. He was the son of a former missionary and Chairman of Mysore District, Rev.William Hubert Thorp and was one among the two Methodists consecrated as bishops. A distinguished scholar and educationist educated at Kingswood School and with degrees from Oxford and Cambridge. He was a brilliant mathematician in the famous Oxford University, but he gave up science for the Church. After a year of studying Comparative Religion at Marburg, Edgar went to the Trichinopoly (Tiruchirappalli) District in 1930. He was the Principal of the Bible School at Dharapuram, training village evangelists. He was the Chairman of the District from 1945 to 1947. He was guiding the diocese as bishop for 15 years and left India in 1962 on health grounds. His ministry among poverty-stricken village Christians in the Dharapuram mass movement area and on the tea plantations in Valparai area, was underpinned by his simple lifestyle; and as bishop, the impartiality of his leadership fostered unity between the Anglican minority and Methodist majority in the diocese. He died at Prestatyn on 1 September 1991.

Bishop Thorp Arts and Science College in Dharapuram is named in his remembrance. Also, the diocese has named a lot of constructions in some of its institutions in his remembrance. For example, Thorp Block at Bishop Heber Higher Secondary School in 2001 Puthur, Tiruchirappalli, Bishop Thorp hostel for women at Bishop Heber College 2008 Tiruchirappalli and Bishop Thorp Memorial Church at Chinnaputhur Pastorate in Dharapuram, 2014 Ammapatti village.

† The Right Rev. Dr. David Chellappa (1962-1964) (Interim Bishop) 

The Rt. Rev. David Chellappa (1905–1964), the first Indian Bishop of the Diocese of Madras of the Church of South India. was requested by The Most Rev. Arnold Henry Legg, the then Moderator of CSI, to extend his service and leadership to Tiruchirappalli Thanjavur diocese, as Bishop Thorp left India on a health emergency and couldn't plan for a backup then. Born in Tanjore in 1905, Chellappa was the son of Justice Daniel Chellappa and Mrs Elizabeth Daniel Chellappa, daughter of Munsif A. David Pillay, who served as the Legal Adviser to King Serfoji II of the Bhonsle dynasty in Thanjavur. Ordained in 1933 by Rt. Rev. Edward Harry Mansfield Waller, he was sent to Tiruchirappalli district to serve two churches - Mettupatti and Irungalur. Graduated with a Master of Arts degree from Durham University in 1954. He became Bishop of Madras the following year. During his stay in United States of America, the famous Hope College, Holland, Michigan State, conferred a honorary Doctor of Divinity [D.D] degree on Rt. Rev. David Chellappa. Bishop Chellappa was guiding the diocese as an "interim Bishop" till 7 February 1964 and passed on to the glory the same year on August 25.

† The Most Rev. Dr. Solomon Doraiswamy (1964-1982)
The Most Rev. Dr. Solomon Doraiswamy was the first Indian bishop to lead the diocese. When Bishop Thorp left India, the diocese was in a state of confusion. The Tiruchirappalli Thanjavur diocese had failed to make a panel. As per the constitution, they were required to send a panel of at least two names. Owing to the internal troubles, they had sent only one name and so the Synod of CSI appointed Rev. Solomon Doraiswamy as the Bishop in Tiruchirappalli Thanjavur diocese. He was officially consecrated as the bishop on 8 February 1964 at St. Peter's Church (built by Rev. Christian Friedrich Schwarz), Thanjavur by The Most Rev. Arnold Henry Legg (Moderator) and co-consecrated by The Most Rev. Pereji Solomon (Deputy Moderator). Bishop Chellappa's ring, cross and Staff were used in the consecration to Bishop Doraiswamy as they were not arranged on time.

During the fourteenth Church of South India Synod held from 10 to 14 January, 1974 at the Women's Christian College, Madras, Bishop Doraiswamy was elected as the Deputy Moderator and held the office from 1974 to 1980 for over three terms (1974-1976; 1976-1978 and 1978–1980).  Again during the seventeenth Church of South India Synod held from 10 to 14 January 1980 at Madras Christian College, Tambaram, Bishop Doraiswamy became the Moderator and held the office for a term up to 1982. During his tenure, he rejuvenated and started so many people-friendly and people-development projects. One of his achievements was the rebirth of Bishop Heber College, Tiruchirapalli. The most remembered are the Bishop Heber College, Bishop Heber Schools, Kindernothilfe, etc. The Senate of Serampore College (University) awarded an honorary doctorate degree to Bishop Doraiswamy in 1981. C.S.I. Bishop Solomon Doraisawmy College of Arts and Science in Karur is named in his remembrance. He retired at his 65th age in the year 1982 on attaining superannuation.

† The Right Rev. Dr. Rajamanickam Paulraj (1982-1998)

The Right Rev. Dr. Rajamanickam Paulraj was elected and consecrated as the third Bishop of the Tiruchirappalli Thanjavur diocese on 21 January 1982. He guided the diocese for 16 years. An excellent scholar and a bishop who was awarded three doctorates. He was actively involved in the CSI Synod as a bishop and was elected to serve as the Deputy Moderator of the Church of South India for the term 1994 – 1996 during the twenty-fourth Church of South India Synod held in January 1994 at the Bishop Heber College, Tiruchirappalli. Considering the need for higher education in Dharapuram area, this former Bishop took great efforts to start "Bishop Thorp College" affiliated to the Bharathiar University, Coimbatore in 1984 – under the C.S.I Tiruchirappalli Thanjavur Diocese. Thus "Bishop Thorp College" emerged as the "First Self-Financing College" in the state of Tamil Nadu. He passed on to the glory at his 82nd age on 18 January 2016.

† The Right Rev. Dr. Daniel James Seenivasan (1998 - 2008)
The Right Rev. Dr. Daniel James Seenivasan was elected and consecrated as the fourth Bishop of the Tiruchirappalli Thanjavur diocese at Bishop Heber College campus in the year 1998. He guided the diocese in this capacity for 10 years. He retired at his 65th age in the year 2008 on attaining superannuation.

† The Right Rev. Dr. Gnanamuthu Paul Vasantha Kumar (2008 - 2018)
The Right Rev. Dr. Gnanamuthu Paul Vasantha Kumar was enthroned as the fifth Bishop of the Tiruchirappalli Thanjavur diocese in the year 2008. He guided the diocese in this capacity for 10 years till he retired at his 67th age on attaining superannuation.

† The Right Rev. Dr. Dhanraj Chandrasekaran (2018 incumbent)
The Right Rev. Dr. Dhanraj Chandrasekaran has been elected and consecrated as the sixth bishop of the diocese. He was consecrated by The Most Rev. Thomas Kanjirappally Oommen, the Moderator of the Church of South India and bishop in Madhya Kerala Diocese, on 28 May 2018 at St. Luke's Church, Bishop Heber College in Tiruchirappalli. One of his achievements was the C.S.I. Bishop Solomon Doraisawmy College of Arts and Science, Karur. He started this college on 22.06.2022, after a long struggle during the COVID-19 time, in memory of the former Moderator of the Church of South India and second Bishop of the diocese The Most Rev. Solomon Doraiswamy.

Theological education
The diocese recognises theological degrees granted by institutions affiliated with the Board of Theological Education of the Senate of Serampore College. These might include:
 Academy of Integrated Christian Studies, Aizawl, Mizoram
 Aizawl Theological College, Aizawl, Mizoram
 Allahabad Bible Seminary, Prayagraj, Uttar Pradesh
 Andhra Christian Theological College, Hyderabad, Telangana
 Baptist Theological College, Pfütsero, Nagaland
 Bethel Bible College, Guntur, Andhra Pradesh
 Bishop's College, Kolkata, West Bengal
 Clark Theological College, Aolijen, Mokokchung, Nagaland
 Calcutta Bible Seminary, Kolkata, West Bengal
 Calvin Institute of Theology, Yacharam Village, Telangana
 Concordia Theological Seminary, Kottar-Parvathipuram Road, Nagercoil, Tamilnadu
 Dharma Jyothi Vidya Peeth, Faridabad, Haryana
 Eastern Theological College, Rajabari, Jorhat, Assam
 Faith Theological Seminary, Adoor, Kerala
 Federated Faculty for Research in Religion & Culture (FFRRC), Kottayam, Kerala
 Gossner Theological College, Ranchi, Jharkhand
 Gujarat United School of Theology, Ahmedabad, Gujarat
 Gurukul Lutheran Theological College & Research Institute, Chennai, Tamil Nadu
 Harding Theological College, Chandmari, Meghalaya
 John Roberts Theological Seminary, Shillong, Meghalaya
 Karnataka Theological College, Mangalore, Karnataka
 Kerala Theological Seminary, Kottarakara, Kerala
 Kerala United Theological Seminary, Thiruvananthapuram, Kerala
 Leonard Theological College, Jabalpur, Madhya Pradesh
 Manipur Theological College, Kangpokpi, Manipur
 Madras Theological Seminary & College, Kilpauk, Chennai, Tamil Nadu
 Malankara Syrian Orthodox Theological Seminary, Mulanthuruthy, Ernakulam, Kerala
 Mar Thoma Theological Seminary, Kottayam, Kerala
 Mar Thoma Episcopal Jubilee Institute of Evangelism, Manjadi, Tiruvalla, Kerala
 Master's College of Theology, Visakhapatnam, Andhra Pradesh
 Methodist Bible Seminary, Vasad, Gujarat
 Mennonite Brethren Centenary Bible College, Shamshabad, Telangana
 Nav Jyoti Post Graduate and Research Centre (NJPGRC), Faridabad, Haryana
 New Theological College, Dehradun, Uttarakhand
 North India Institute of Post Graduate Theological Studies (NIIPGTS), Serampore, Kolkata, West Bengal
 Orissa Christian Theological College, Ganjam, Odisha
 Orthodox Theological Seminary, Kottayam, Kerala
 Santal Theological College, Maharo, Dumka, Jharkhand
 Serampore College (SC), Serampore, Kolkata, West Bengal
 South Asia Theological Research Institute (SATHRI), Bengaluru
 St. Andrew's Theological College, Dhaka, Bangladesh
 St. Thomas Orthodox Theological Seminary, Kalmeshwar, Maharashtra
 South India Biblical Seminary, Bangarapet, Karnataka
 Tamil Nadu Theological Seminary (TTS), Madurai, Tamil Nadu
 Theological College of Lanka, Pilimatalawa, Sri Lanka
 Trinity Theological College, Dimapur, Nagaland
 Trulock Theological Seminary, Imphal, Manipur
 Union Biblical Seminary, Pune, Maharashtra
 United Theological College (UTC), Bengaluru, Karnataka
 United Theological Seminary of Maharashtra, Pune, Maharashtra
 Witter Theological College, Wokha, Nagaland

List of Pastorates in Tiruchirappalli Thanjavur Diocese

List of Pastorates in Anaimalai (Valparai) DCC
 Anaimudi Pastorate
 Henry Edwin Bleby Pastorate
 Iyerpadi Pastorate
 Karumalai Pastorate
 Mudis Pastorate
 Nadumalai Pastorate
 Sholayar Nagar Pastorate
 Sirukundra Pastorate
 Valparai Pastorate
 Vellonie Pastorate
 Waterfalls Pastorate

List of Pastorates in Dharapuram DCC
 Avinashipalayam Pastorate
 Bethel (Dharapuram) Pastorate
 Chinnaputhur Pastorate
 Dharapuram Town Pastorate
 Dharapuram Central Pastorate
 Devanurpudur Pastorate
 Gudimangalam Pastorate
 Kannivadi Pastorate
 Kundadam Pastorate
 Koothampoondi Pastorate
 Kallivalasu Pastorate
 Kolathupalayam Pastorate
 Madathukulam Pastorate
 Manakadavu Pastorate
 Mulanur Pastorate
 Perunkarunaipalayam Pastorate
 St. Thomas Pastorate (Dharapuram Rural)
 Thalavaipattinam Pastorate
 Thayampalayam Pastorate
 Udumalaipettai Pastorate
 Uthiyur Pastorate
 Vellakovil Pastorate

List of Pastorates in Karur DCC
 Aravakurichi Pastorate
 Chinnadharapuram Pastorate
 Karur Paramathi (K.Paramathi) Pastorate
 Karur Pastorate
 Kulithalai Pastorate
 Musiri Pastorate
 Puliyur Pastorate
 Thalavapalayam Pastorate
 Thanthonimalai Pastorate
 Thennilai Pastorate
 Visuvanathapuri Pastorate

List of Pastorates in Perambalur-Kollidam DCC
 Annamangalam Pastorate
 Ariyalur Pastorate
 Chidambaram Pastorate
 Irungalur Pastorate
 Jayankondam Pastorate
 Lalgudi Pastorate
 Mettu Irungalur Pastorate
 Mettupatti Pastorate
 Perambalur Pastorate
 Pudukottai Village Pastorate
 Pullambadi Pastorate
 Thuraiyur Pastorate
 Viragalur Pastorate

List of Pastorates in Thanjavur DCC
 Aathanur Pastorate
 Anaikaadu Pastorate
 Aranthangi Pastorate
 Karaikal Pastorate
 Kumbakonam Pastorate
 Mannargudi Town Pastorate
 Mannargudi Rural Pastorate
 Mayiladuthurai Pastorate
 Melanatham Pastorate
 Nagapattinam Pastorate
 Nangur Pastorate
 Pattukottai Pastorate
 St. Peter's Church & Pastorate
 St. Andrews Church & Pastorate
 The Fort Christ Church & Pastorate
 Thiruvarur Pastorate

List of Pastorates in Tharangambadi-Nagapattinam DCC

List of Pastorates in Tiruchirappalli DCC
 All Saints Church & Pastorate
 Bethel Church & Pastorate
 Christ Church GOC. North – D & Pastorate
 Emmanuel Church & Pastorate
 Holy Trinity Church, Kattur & Pastorate
 Manapparai Pastorate
 OFT Church & Pastorate
 Redeemer's Church & Pastorate
 St. Andrew's Church & Pastorate
 St. Christopher's Church & Pastorate
 St. Mathew's Church & Pastorate
 St. John's Church & Pastorate
 Luke's Church & Pastorate (Bishop Heber College Chapel, Tabernacle of Testimony)
 St. Marks, Karumandapam Pastorate
 St. Paul's Church & Pastorate
 St. Peter's GOC Church & Pastorate
 St. Thomas Church & Pastorate
 The Fort Christ Church & Pastorate

List of Pastorates in Udumalaipettai DCC

Bishops appointed in India by Church of England before the Church of South India Union
 The Bishop Thomas Fanshawe Middleton, consecrated on 1814; died at Calcutta on 8 July 1822 due to sunstroke and is buried under the altar of St. John's Church, Kolkata the then cathedral of Calcutta.
 The Bishop Reginald Heber, consecrated on 1 June 1823 and arrived at Calcutta on 10 October 1823; died at Trichinopoly on 3 April 1826 due to a cold stroke and buried under the north side of the altar of St. John's Church, Trichinopoly(Tiruchirappalli) where he preached his last sermon.
 The Bishop John Thomas James, consecrated on 3 June 1827 and arrived at Calcutta on 18 January 1828; sailed for China on 9 August 1828, but died due to illness during the voyage on 22 August 1828 and buried at sea a few miles off Singapore.
 The Bishop John Matthew Turner, consecrated 17 May 1829 and arrived at Calcutta on 10 December 1829; died at Calcutta on 7 July 1831 and buried in the churchyard of St. John's Church, Kolkata, Calcutta.
 The Metropolitan of India, Bishop Daniel Wilson, First Metropolitan of India and Ceylon; consecrated and arrived at Calcutta on 5 November 1832; died at Calcutta on 2 January 1858 and is buried in St. Paul's Cathedral, Kolkata, Calcutta.
 The Metropolitan of India, The Bishop George Edward Lynch Cotton, consecrated on 1858; drowned in the Ganges at Kushtea while consecrating a cemetery on 7 October 1866. His body was never recovered.
 The Metropolitan of India, The Bishop Robert Milman, consecrated on 2 February 1867. He caught a chill when travelling from Calcutta to Peshawur and died at Rawal Pindi in February 1876. He had never married.
 The Metropolitan of India, The Bishop Edward Ralph Johnson, consecrated on 1876; resigned due to illness on 1898; died outside India on 11 September 1912.
 The Metropolitan of India, Bishop James Edward Cowell Welldon, consecrated 1898; resigned owing to ill health in early 1902 and disagreement with the Viceroy, Lord Curzon; was a lifelong bachelor, and for nearly fifty years had the close companionship of a manservant, Edward Hudson Perkins, from whose death in 1932 Welldon never recovered and died at Sevenoaks, Kent, on 17 June 1937 aged eighty-three.
 The Metropolitan of India, The Bishop Reginald Stephen Copleston, consecrated Bishop of Colombo, in Westminster Abbey, 1875 and served for 27 years in Colombo; translated to Calcutta on 20 May 1902; resigned on 20 January 1913 and died at Putney in England on 19 April 1925. 
 The Metropolitan of India, The Bishop George Alfred Lefroy, consecrated Bishop of Lahore on 1 November 1899; translated to Calcutta on 19 February 1913; died on 1 January 1919 in the close of the Calcutta Cathedral.
 The Metropolitan of India, The Bishop Foss Westcott, consecrated as Bishop of Chota-Nagpur on 1905; translated to Calcutta 1919 and served as The Metropolitan of India, Burma and Ceylon until 1945. He resigned and retired in 1945 to spend the last four years of his life at St. Paul's School in Darjeeling.  There he died and was buried in a garden on the school grounds
 The Metropolitan of India, The Bishop George Clay Hubback, was consecrated as The Bishop of Assam in 1924; translated to Calcutta and became the last European Metropolitan of India in 1945; retired in 1950 and died on 2 November 1955.

The Bishops of Calcutta became Metropolitans in 1835; Royal Letters Patent, dated 10 October 1835.

References

External links 
 CSI Synod
 Church of South India International Resource Center
 CSI Mission General Hospital, Trichy

Trichy-Tanjore
Christianity in Tamil Nadu
Christian organizations established in 1947
1947 establishments in India
Mayiladuthurai district
Nagapattinam district
Tiruvarur district
Thanjavur district
Tiruchirappalli district
Perambalur district
Karur district
Tiruppur district
Coimbatore district
Cuddalore district
Pudukkottai district
Ariyalur district
Christianity in Puducherry
Karaikal district